BlazBlue: Chrono Phantasma, released in Japan as BlazBlue: Chronophantasma, is a 2-D fighting game developed by Arc System Works. It is the third game of the Blazblue series, set after the events of BlazBlue: Continuum Shift. The game was originally to be released first as an arcade game in the early fourth quarter of 2012, which was later pushed forward to November, 2012. A PlayStation 3 version of the game was released in Japan on October 24, 2013, while it was released in the North America on March 25, 2014. Due to limited hardware and disc space the game was not released on the Xbox 360.

An updated version of the game titled BlazBlue: Chrono Phantasma Extend, dubbed as BlazBlue: Chrono Phantasma 2.0 in the Arcade version, was originally released for Arcades in October 2014, and for the PlayStation 3, PlayStation Vita, PlayStation 4, and Xbox One in April 2015. It was released on June 30, 2015, in North America, with the European region version releasing on October 23, 2015.

Gameplay
Besides normal rebalancing from Continuum Shift Extend, Chrono Phantasma features several revamped gameplay mechanics and introduces seven new characters to the roster (with two additional characters added to the Extend version of Chrono Phantasma). Several character sprites have also been redrawn, including a full new set of sprites depicting Noel Vermillion in a new costume. Several new songs were composed for the game and all previous musical character themes were re-arranged. The storyline continues after events of Continuum Shift.

A new mechanic called "Overdrive" has been added to the game, replacing the Gold Bursts from Continuum Shift. Green Bursts are still in but are the only form of Burst available. Distortion Drives such as Ragna's "Blood Kain", Taokaka's "Almost Becoming Two!", Litchi's "Great Wheel" and Bang's "Fu-Rin-Ka-Zan" have been retooled to be their respective characters' Overdrives. The length of an Overdrive increases the lower a character's health is, and performing an Overdrive stops the round timer while it is active.

Guard Primers have been removed entirely and the Guard Crush has been moved to a new mechanic called "Crush Trigger" where, at the cost of 25 Heat, a player may hit the A and B attack buttons simultaneously to cause a Guard Crush against blocking opponents, provided the opponent is not using Barrier Block.

Characters

19 characters from BlazBlue: Continuum Shift Extend return in Chrono Phantasma, with the exception of Lambda-11, who was replaced by Nu-13 in the original release of the game. In Extend, both Lambda and Nu become separate characters. This brings the total roster to 28 playable characters. Characters introduced in Chrono Phantasma include:

Amane Nishiki, an effeminate young man clad in a kimono and the leader of a troupe of street performers. Is interested in meeting Carl Clover for an unknown reason.
Bullet, a mercenary who seeks revenge on Sector Seven for the death of her squad.
Azrael, a blood-thirsty, fist-fighting soldier of Sector Seven. Previously locked down by Kokonoe and Tager, is recently released by the higher-ups at Sector Seven.
Izayoi, the true form of Tsubaki Yayoi after the Sealed Weapon Izayoi's powers are fully released.
Takemikazuchi, the final boss of the game, unplayable.
Introduced in console release
Kagura Mutsuki, the head of one of the most powerful Duodecim families and one of the NOL's greatest generals.
Introduced as DLC characters in console release
Yuuki Terumi, one of the Six Heroes and the ghost who used Hazama as his vessel now forced to be a separate entity. He was the one who created the Azure Grimore, and the true villain of the series, with his true identity being Susano'o.
Kokonoe Mercury, a genius scientist of Sector Seven and the daughter of two of the Six Heroes, Jubei and Nine.
Introduced in Extend update
Celica A. Mercury, a girl with courteous disposition and an infectiously optimistic outlook on life. Also, the sister of Nine, one of the Six Heroes.
Lambda-11, a character who was introduced in Continuum Shift, and originally as a normal mode palette swap for Nu-13's Unlimited Mode only in that second game. Later re-introduce a standalone separate character on her own, such as having newly move sets and playstyles on her own, in contrast of Nu-13's playstyles and move sets, starting from this game. Silent and devoid of emotions, Lambda speaks in a very mechanical and detached manner, and is incapable of taking any kind of action without a direct command to do so.

Development and release

Blazblue: Chrono Phantasma was announced on August 5th, 2012.

BlazBlue: Chrono Phantasma sold 86,771 copies in its first two weeks on sale, making it the best debut in the BlazBlue series so far. The Vita version sold 10,709 copies in Japan.

BlazBlue: Chrono Phantasma Extend

BlazBlue: Chrono Phantasma Extend was announced on September 22, 2014, for release on arcades (as BlazBlue: Chrono Phantasma 2.0), and later announced on December 16, 2014, for consoles (as Chrono Phantasma Extend). Chrono Phantasma Extend adds two additional characters: Lambda-11 (who was introduced in Continuum Shift, originally being a normal mode palette swap for Nu-13's Unlimited Mode only) and Celica A. Mercury.

The console release introduced extra story modes, such as the Beach Scenario from the PlayStation Vita version of Chrono Phantasma, a new story based on the BlazBlue: Remix Heart manga, and additional scenarios for certain characters such as Kokonoe, Kagura, and Bullet. For the localized version of Extend, Library Mode is reintroduced from the Japanese release. The PlayStation Vita version of Chrono Phantasma Extend also adds dual audio to the Story Mode, which was not present in the original Vita release. BlazBlue Chrono Phantasma Extend was released for PC through Steam on March 2, 2016.

In Japan, BlazBlue: Chrono Phantasma Extend sold 20,420 copies on PS3 and 7,589 copies on PS4.

Reception

BlazBlue Chrono Phantasma received positive reviews upon release, with critics citing the overhauled fighting mechanics as an improvement over Calamity Trigger and Continuum Shift, seven new unique fighters, smooth online play, in-depth training and tutorial modes, and an engaging story. Criticism was still directed toward the character designs, as well as confusion of playing story mode without past knowledge of the previous games.

References

External links

2012 video games
2D fighting games
Arcade video games
Arc System Works games
BlazBlue
Fighting games used at the Evolution Championship Series tournament
Multiplayer and single-player video games
PlayStation 3 games
PlayStation Vita games
PlayStation 4 games
NESiCAxLive games
Fighting games
Video games with 2.5D graphics
Xbox One games
Windows games
Video games developed in Japan
Video games with cross-platform play
PQube games

ja:BLAZBLUE